Parimutuel betting or pool betting is a betting system in which all bets of a particular type are placed together in a pool; taxes and the "house-take" or "vigorish" are deducted, and payoff odds are calculated by sharing the pool among all winning bets. In some countries it is known as the tote after the totalisator, which calculates and displays bets already made. In short, the word parimutuel implies tiered winnings/earnings.

The parimutuel system is used in gambling on horse racing, greyhound racing, jai alai, and other sporting events of relatively short duration in which participants finish in a ranked order. A modified parimutuel system is also used in some lottery games.

Definition
Parimutuel betting differs from fixed-odds betting in that the final payout is not determined until the pool is closed – in fixed odds betting, the payout is agreed at the time the bet is sold.

Parimutuel gambling is frequently state-regulated, and offered in many places where gambling is otherwise illegal. Parimutuel gambling is often also offered at "off track" facilities, where players may bet on the events without actually being present to observe them in person.

Example
In a hypothetical event that has eight possible outcomes, in a country using a decimal currency such as dollars, each outcome has a certain amount of money wagered:

Thus, the total pool of money on the event is $1028.00. Following the start of the event, no more wagers are accepted. The event is decided and the winning outcome is determined to be Outcome 4 with $110.00 wagered. The payout is now calculated. First the commission or take for the wagering company is deducted from the pool. For example, with a commission rate of 14.25% the calculation is: $1028 × 0.1425 = $146.49. This leaves a remaining amount of $881.51. This remaining amount in the pool is now distributed to those who wagered on Outcome 4: $881.51 / $110.00 = 8.01 ≈ $8 per $1 wagered. This payout includes the $1 wagered plus an additional $7 profit. Thus, the odds on Outcome 4 are 7-to-1 (or, expressed as decimal odds, 8.01).

Prior to the event, betting agencies will often provide approximates for what will be paid out for a given outcome should no more bets be accepted at the current time. Using the wagers and commission rate above (14.25%), an approximates table in decimal odds and fractional odds would be:

In real-life examples, such as horse racing, the pool size often extends into millions of dollars with many different types of outcomes (winning horses) and complex commission calculations.

Sometimes, the amounts paid out are rounded down to a denomination interval — in California, Australia, and British Columbia 10¢ intervals are used.  The rounding loss is known as breakage and is retained by the betting agency as part of the commission.

In some situations, a negative breakage may occur.  For example, in horse racing when an overwhelming favorite wins (or shows or places).  The parimutuel calculation results might call for a very small winning payout (say, $1.02 or $1.03 on a dollar bet), but legal regulations may require a larger payout (e.g., minimum $1.10 on a dollar bet).  This condition is sometimes referred to as a minus pool.

Algebraic summary
In an event with a set of n possible single-winner outcomes, with wagers  the total pool of money on the event is

When there are  possible winners, such as a North American "place" bet which has  winners, the total amount to be distributed  is first divided into  equal shares.

History
The parimutuel system was invented by Catalan impresario Joseph Oller in 1867.

The large amount of calculation involved in this system led to the invention of a specialized mechanical calculating machine known as a totalisator, "automatic totalisator" or "tote board", invented by the Australian engineer George Alfred Julius. The first was installed at Ellerslie Racecourse, Auckland, New Zealand in 1913, and they came into widespread use at race courses throughout the world. The U.S. introduction was in 1927, which led to the opening of the suburban Arlington Racetrack in Arlington Park, near Chicago and Sportsman's Park in Cicero, Illinois, in 1932.

Strategy and comparison with independent bookmakers
Unlike many forms of casino gambling, in parimutuel betting the gambler bets against other gamblers, not the house, which necessarily implies that the bank cannot be broken.  The science of predicting the outcome of a race is called handicapping.

Independent off-track bookmakers typically have a smaller take and thus offer better payoffs, but they are illegal in some countries. However, the introduction of Internet gambling led to "rebate shops". These off-shore betting shops promise to return some percentage of every bet made to the bettor. They may reduce their take from 15–18% to as little as 1–2%, while still generating a profit by operating with minimal overhead.

Parimutuel bet types 
There may be several different types of bets, in which case each type of bet has its own pool. The basic bets involve predicting the order of finish for a single participant, as follows:

North America

In Canada and the United States, the most common types of bet on horse races include:

 Single race

 Win: to succeed the bettor must pick the horse that wins the race.
 Place: the bettor must pick a horse that finishes either first or second.
 Show: the bettor must pick a horse that finishes first, second or third.
 Across the board: the bettor places three separate bets to win, place or show.
 Exacta, perfecta, or exactor: the bettor must pick the two horses that finish first and second, in the exact order.
 Trifecta or triactor: the bettor must pick the three horses that finish first, second, and third, in the exact order.
 Superfecta: the bettor must pick the four horses that finish first, second, third and fourth, in the exact order.
 Box: a box can be placed around exotic betting types such as exacta, trifecta or superfecta bets. This places a bet for all permutations of the numbers in the box. A trifecta box with three numbers has six possible permutations (for each of the three horses in the "box" that can finish first, there are two possibilities for which will finish second: 3 × 2) and costs six times the betting base amount. A trifecta box with five numbers has 60 possible permutations and costs 60 times the betting base amount (5 × 4 × 3). In France, a "box" gives only the ordered permutations going along an ordered list of numbers such that a trifecta box with six numbers would cost 20 times the base amount.  For a single race, a wheel bet picks the winning horse, paired with any of the remaining horses in the field to finish second.  For example, a wheel bet of "3-all" in a given race picks the #3 horse to win, and any other horse in the field to finish second (each permutation being a single bet - thus, in this example, if there are 5 horses in the field, a "3-all wheel" would 4 bets).
 Quinella or Quiniela: the bettor must pick the two horses that finish first and second. Final order does not matter. This bet is technically different than an Exacta box, which is 2 bets total, one for each possible finishing permutation. Each horse's odds will produce two different payouts, commonly occurring when a favorite is paired with a longshot. A winning quinella can pay more than a winning exacta box. Sum the quotients of the quinella payout divided by each exacta permutation payout. The bettor should place a quinella bet if the sum is greater than 1.
 Any2 or Duet: The bettor must pick the two horses who will place first, second or third but can finish in any order. This could be thought of as a double horse show key (see below).
Hi 5 or Super 5: The bettor must pick five horses finishing in the exact order.  Typically does not occur unless there are 8 or more horses in a race.

 Multiple races

Double: the bettor must pick the winners of two successive races (a 'running' or 'rolling' double); most race tracks in Canada and the United States take double wagers on the first two races on the program (the daily double) and on the last two (the late double).
Triple: the bettor must pick the winners of three successive races; like doubles, many tracks offer "running" or "rolling" triples. Also called pick three or more commonly, a treble.
Quadrella or Quaddie: The bettor must pick the winners of four nominated races at the same track.
Pick six or Sweep six: Traditionally, the bettor must pick the winners of six consecutive races. However, there are variants ranging from three to nine races, with a four-race bet known as a Pick Four. Exclusively for the pick six, a progressive jackpot is sponsored by the host track and available at its satellite locations which grows until someone picks six winners correctly. There is also a consolation prize for those who pick five winners correctly, divided amongst the number of tickets registered in the system with five out of six right, in a case where nobody gets five or six winners, a four out of six consolation prize may occur. A Place Pick Nine makes up for the increased difficulty of the high number of races by allowing a second-place finish for a bettor's selected horse to count as a win.
Jackpot: A twist on the traditional Pick 6 or Hi 5 bet is one where the progressive jackpot is paid only if there is one winning bet. In this case, the consolation prize is given to the multiple holders of the winning bets with the jackpot growing until there is one winner. If there is no winner when the racing season ends, a "mandatory payout" occurs typically on the last racing day where the jackpot is paid out to whoever has a winning bet.

Win, place and show wagers class as straight bets, and the remaining wagers as exotic bets. Bettors usually make multiple wagers on exotic bets. A box consists of a multiple wager in which bettors bet all possible combinations of a group of horses in the same race. A key involves making a multiple wager with a single horse in one race bet in one position with all possible combinations of other selected horses in a single race. A multi-race wheel (cf. wheel, above) consists of betting all horses in one race of a bet involving two or more races. For example, a 1-all daily double wheel bets the 1-horse in the first race with every horse in the second.

People making straight bets commonly employ the strategy of an "each way" bet. Here the bettor picks a horse and bets it will win, and makes an additional bet that it will show, so that theoretically if the horse runs third it will at least pay back the two bets. The Canadian and American equivalent is the bet across (short for across the board): the bettor bets equal sums on the horse to win, place, and show.

A parlay, accumulator or roll-up consists of a series of bets in which bettors stake the winnings from one race on the next in order until either the bettor loses or the series completes successfully.

Australia/New Zealand

 Single race

 Win: Runner must finish first.
 Place: Runner must finish first, second or third place. In events with five to seven runners, no dividends are payable on third place (signified by "NTD" or No Third Dividend) and in events with 4 or fewer runners, only Win betting is allowed.
 Each-Way: A combination of Win and Place. A $5 bet Each-way is a $5.00 bet to Win and a $5.00 bet to Place, for a total bet cost of $10.
 Exacta: The bettor must correctly pick the two runners which finish first and second.
 Quinella: The bettor must pick the two runners which finish first and second, but need not specify which will finish first.
 Trifecta: The bettor must correctly pick the three runners which finish first, second, and third.
 First4: The bettor must correctly pick the four runners which finish first, second, third and fourth.
 Duet: The bettor must pick two horses who will place first, second or third but can finish in any order.

 Multiple races

 Running Double: The bettor must pick the winners of two consecutive races at same track.
 Daily Double: The bettor must pick the winners of two nominated races at the same track.
 Treble: The bettor must pick the winners of three nominated races at the same track. This bet type is only available in the states of Queensland and South Australia.
 Quadrella or Quaddie: The bettor must pick the winners of four nominated races at the same track.
 Big 6: The bettor must pick the winners of six nominated races, which can be at the same track or split over two or more tracks.

In Australia, certain exotic bet types can be laid as "flexi" bets. Usually the price of an exotic bet is determined by a set multiple of the outcome, for example $60 for a five horse boxed trifecta at one unit ($1)—or $30 at half unit (50c). If the bet is successful, the bettor will get either the full winning amount shown on the board, or half the winning amount. Under a flexi system the bettor can nominate their desired total wager, and their percentage of payout is determined by this wager's relationship to the full unit price. Using a five horse box trifecta, the bettor may wish to lay only $20 on the outcome. Their percentage of winnings is now calculated as $20/$60 = 33.3%. If the bet is successful, the payout will be 33.3% of the winning amount for a full unit bet.

In recent times the "Roving Banker" variant for Trifecta and First4 betting is now offered. For a Roving Banker First4 the player selects one, two or three runners they believe will definitely finish 1st, 2nd, 3rd or 4th, and up to three selections as Roving Banker(s) with other runners to fill the remaining place(s). A Roving Banker Trifecta is where the player believes that one or two runners will definitely finish 1st, 2nd or 3rd. The bet can be placed by picking the player's favourite runner to finish in any place within the bet and complete the Trifecta with any number of other runners to fill the other placing(s).

United Kingdom

The following pools are operated at meetings in mainland Britain:

 Single race

 Win: Runner must finish first.
 Place: Runner must finish within the first two places (in a 5–7 runner race), three places (8–15 runners and non-handicaps with 16+ runners) or four places (handicaps with 16+ runners).
 Each-way: Charged and settled as one bet to win and another bet to place (for example, a punter asking for a bet of "five pounds each way" will be expected to pay ten pounds).
 Exacta: The bettor must correctly pick the two runners which finish first and second, in the correct order.
 Trifecta: The bettor must correctly pick the three runners which finish first, second, and third, in the correct order.
 Swinger: The bettor must correctly pick two runners to finish in the places, both runners must place, in any order.

 Multiple races

 Jackpot: Pick the winner from each of the first six races of the advertised Jackpot meeting of the day.
 Placepot: Pick a placed horse from each of the first six races from any British race meeting.
 Quadpot: Pick a placed horse from the third, fourth, fifth and sixth race from any British race meeting.
 Scoop6: Pick the winner (for the win fund) or a placed horse (for the place fund) from the six advertised Scoop6 races. Saturdays only.
 Super7: Pick the winner from seven races. This bet ceased being offered by totepool from January 2012.

Exotic wagers are usually made on horses running at the same track on the same program. In the United Kingdom, bookmakers also offer exotic wagers on horses at different tracks. Probably the Yankee occurs most commonly: in this the bettor tries to pick the winner of four races. This bet also includes subsidiary wagers on smaller combinations of the chosen horses; for example, if only two of the four horses win, the bettor still collects for their double. A Trixie requires trying to pick three winners, and a Canadian or Super Yankee trying to pick five; these also include subsidiary bets. There are also other bets which are large combinations of singles, doubles, trebles and accumulators some of them are called Lucky 15, Lucky 31, Heinz, Super Heinz, Goliath. The term nap identifies the best bet of the day.

Ireland
Tote Ireland operates the following pools

 Single race

 Win: Runner must finish first
 Place: Runner must finish within the first two places (in a 5–7 runner race), three places (8–15 runners and non-handicaps with 16+ runners) or four places (handicaps with 16+ runners). (From 23 April 2000 to 23 May 2010, Tote Ireland operated 4-place betting on all races with 16 or more runners.)
 Each-way: Charged and settled as one bet to win and another bet to place (for example, a punter asking for a bet of "five euro each way" will be expected to pay ten euro).
 Exacta: The bettor must correctly pick the two runners which finish first and second, in the correct order (replaced Forecast which allowed any order).
 Trifecta: The bettor must correctly pick the three runners which finish first, second, and third, in the correct order (introduced on 26 May 2010, replacing Trio which allowed any order).

 Multiple races

 Jackpot: A Pick 4 bet on races 3–6 at every meeting.
 Pick Six: On races 1–6 at one meeting on all Sundays and occasionally on other days (introduced on 9 January 2011).
 Placepot: The better must correctly pick one horse to place in each of the races 2–7.

Sweden
Bet types for harness racing (trotting):

 Single race

 Vinnare (winner): Runner must finish first.
 Plats (place): Runner must finish within the first two places (up to five runners) or first three places (six runners or more).
 Vinnare & Plats: Two bets, one on "vinnare" and one on "plats" for the same runner. Asking for a bet of "50 SEK vinnare och plats" costs 100 SEK
 Tvilling (twin): The bettor must pick the runners that finish first and second, but need not specify which will finish first.
 Trio (trio): The bettor must pick the runners that finish first, second and third in a nominated race.

 Multiple races

 Dagens Dubbel (daily double) and Lunchdubbel (lunch double): The bettor must pick the winners of two nominated races at the same track.
 V3: The bettor must pick the winners of three nominated races at the same track. Unlike V4, V5, V65 and V75, where a bet for all races must be made before the start of the first race, in V3 the bettor selects the winner one race at a time.
 V4: The bettor must pick the winners of four nominated races at the same track.
 V5: The bettor must pick the winners of five nominated races at the same track.
 V65: The bettor must pick the winners of six nominated races at the same track. Return is also given for (combinations of) five correctly picked winners, even if the same bet included all the six winners.
 V64: The bettor must pick the winners of six nominated races at the same track. Return is also given for (combinations of) five or four correctly picked winners, even if the same bet included more correct picks.
 V75: The bettor must pick the winners of seven nominated races at the same track. Return is also given for (combinations of) six or five winners picked correctly, even if the same bet included more correct picks. The betting pool is split into three separate pools for all combinations of seven (40%), six (20%) and five (40%) correctly picked winners. This is the largest nationwide betting game in Sweden, running each Saturday with weekly pools of about 80 MSEK ($11 million).
 V86: The bettor must pick the winners of eight nominated races at the same track. Return is also given for (combinations of) seven or six winners picked correctly, even if the same bet included more correct picks. The betting pool is split into three separate pools for all combinations of eight (40%), seven (20%) and six (40%) correctly picked winners.

Hong Kong
The Hong Kong Jockey Club (HKJC) operates the following common bet types and pools for horse racing.

 Single race

 Win: Select correctly the 1st horse in a race.	
 Place: Select correctly the 1st, 2nd or 3rd horse in a race with 7 or more declared starters, alternatively select correctly the 1st or 2nd in a race where there are 4 to 6 declared starters.
 Quinella: Select correctly the 1st and 2nd horses in any order in a race.
 Quinella Place: Select correctly any two of the first three placed horses in any order in a race.
 Tierce: Select the 1st, 2nd and 3rd horses in the correct order in a race.
 Trio: Select correctly the 1st, 2nd and 3rd horses in any order in a race.
 Quartet: Select correctly the 1st, 2nd, 3rd and 4th in correct order in a race
 First 4: Select correctly the 1st, 2nd, 3rd and 4th horses in any order in a race.

 Multiple races

 Double: Select correctly the 1st horse in each of the two nominated races. There is a consolation prize given under the conditions that the player has selected correctly the 1st horse in the first nominated race and the 2nd horse in the second nominated race.
 Treble: Select correctly the 1st horse in each of the three nominated races. There is a consolation prize given under the conditions that the player has selected correctly the 1st horse in the first two Legs and the 2nd horse in the third Leg of the three nominated races.
 Double Trio: Select correctly the 1st, 2nd and 3rd horses in any order in each of the two nominated races.
 Triple Trio: Select correctly the 1st, 2nd and 3rd in any order in each of the three nominated races. There is a consolation prize given under the conditions that the player has selected correctly the 1st, 2nd and 3rd horses in any order in the first two Legs of the three nominated races.
 Six Up: Select correctly the 1st or 2nd horse in each of the six nominated races. There is a consolation prize given under the conditions that the player has selected correctly the 1st horse in each of the six nominated races.

Japan
In Japan, horse racing (競馬, keiba), velodrome cycling (競輪, keirin), stock outboard powerboat racing (競艇, Kyōtei), and paved flat track motorcycle racing (オートレース, Auto Race) operate the following parimutuel types. Wager must be a multiple of 100 yen except Each-way.
 Win (単勝, Tanshō): Runner must finish first. (horse racing, powerboat racing, flat track racing)
 Place-Show (複勝, Fukushō): Runner must finish within the first two places (up to seven participants) or three places (more than eight participants). (horse racing, powerboat racing, flat track racing)
 Each-way (応援馬券, Ōen Baken): To place one bet to Win and another bet to Place-Show. (For example, betting 1,000 yen to Each-way means betting 500 yen to Win and 500 yen to Place-Show.) Wager must be multiple of 200 yen (JRA-sanctioned horse racing).
 Bracket Quinella (枠番連勝複式, Wakuban Renshō Fukushiki), abbreviated as Waku-ren (枠連): The bettor must pick the two bracket numbers which finish first and second, but need not specify which will finish first. A bracket number (枠番, Wakuban) means runner's cap color (1: White; 2: Black; 3: Red; 4: Blue; 5: Yellow; 6: Green; 7: Orange; 8: Pink) (used in horse racing, cycling, and flat track).
 Bracket Exacta (枠番連勝単式, Wakuban Renshō Tanshiki), abbreviated as Waku-tan (枠単): The bettor must correctly pick the two bracket numbers which finish first and second (non-JRA horse racing).
 Quinella (連勝複式, Renshō Fukushiki), abbreviated as Uma-ren (馬連), Ni-sha-fuku (2車複) or Ni-renpuku (2連複): The bettor must pick the two runners which finish first and second, but need not specify which will finish first (all four).
 Exacta (連勝単式, Renshō Tanshiki), abbreviated as Uma-tan (馬単), Ni-sha-tan (2車単) or Ni-ren-tan (2連単): The bettor must correctly pick the two runners which finish first and second (all four).
 Quinella-Place (拡大連勝複式, Kakudai Renshō Fukushiki), also known as Wide (ワイド) or Kaku-renpuku (拡連複): The bettor must pick the two runners which finish the top three—no need to specify an order (For example, when the result of race is 3-6-2-4-5-1, the top three runners are 2, 3 and 6, and winning combinations are 2-3, 2-6 and 3-6.) (all four).
 Trio (3連勝複式, Sanrensho Fukushiki), abbreviated as San-renpuku (3連複): The bettor must pick the three runners which finish the top three, but no need to specify an order (all four).
 Trifecta (3連勝単式, Sanrensho Tanshiki), abbreviated as San-ren-tan (3連単): The bettor must correctly pick the three runners which finish first, second, and third (all four).
 WIN 5 / Select 5: The bettor must pick the winners of five designated races. Betting on operators' website by PC or cellular phone only (horse racing only).

France

The following bet type are offered by the government-controlled betting agency Pari Mutuel Urbain (PMU).

 Simple Gagnant (Win): The bettor must correctly pick the runner that finishes first.
 Simple Placé (Place): The bettor must pick a runner that finishes either first, second or third in the race. If there are 7 or less starters in the race then third place is not counted and the bettor must pick a horse that finishes either first or second. This bet type is not available on events with 3 or fewer runners.
 Couplé Gagnant (Quinella): The bettor must correctly pick the two runners which finish first and second in any order. 
 Couplé Placé (Duet): The bettor must correctly pick two of the first three finishers in any order. This bet type is not available on events with 3 or fewer runners.
 Couplé Ordre (Exacta): The bettor must correctly pick the two runners which finish first and second in the correct order. Only available on races with 4-7 runners.
 Trio: The bettor must correctly pick the first three finishers in any order. Only available on races with 8+ runners. 
 Trio Ordre (Trifecta): The bettor must correctly pick the first, second and third finishers in their finishing order. Only available on races with 4-7 runners.
 Tiercé/Tiercé Classic: First created in 1954. The bettor must correctly pick the first, second and third finishers in the race with a main dividend paid for selecting the exact order of finish, and a secondary "Désordre" dividend paid for selecting the correct three runners but in the wrong order. Essentially a combination Trio Ordre/Trio bet with the main dividend paying at least 5 times the secondary one. On popular or famous races this bet type is sometimes labelled "Tiercé Classique" but follows the same rules as the standard Tiercé.
 Quarté+: The bettor aims to correctly pick the first four finishers in the race with a main dividend paid for selecting the first four runners in their exact order of finish, a secondary "Désordre" dividend paid for the selecting the first four finishers but in an incorrect finishing order and a tertiary "Bonus" dividend paid for correctly selecting only the first three runners (in any order).
 Quinté+: The bettor aims to correctly pick the first five finishers in the race with a main dividend paid for selecting the first five runners in their exact finishing order, a secondary "Désordre" dividend paid for the selecting the first five finishers but in an incorrect finishing order, a "Bonus 4" dividend for selecting the first four finishers in any order, a "Bonus 4sur5" dividend for selecting four of the first five finishers in any order and a "Bonus 3" for selecting the first three finishers in any order. Furthermore, each Quinté+ ticket is given a number between 1 and 3,000 for a possibility of winning the Tirelire which is a cumulated jackpot of at least 500,000 € but often exceeding millions of euros. In order to win this jackpot, one needs to win the Quinté Ordre (five first finishers in order) and have the winning number which is drawn and published moments before the race starts. A matching No Plus number multiplies earning by ten on any Quinté ticket irrespective of the order.
 Pick5: The bettor aims to correctly pick the first five finishers in the race irrespective of the order. PMU selects races on which this bet is available.
 2sur4: The bettor must correctly pick two out of the first four finishers in the race in any order. Only available on races with 10 or more starters.
 Multi/Mini Multi: The bettor selects between 4 and 7 horses for the Multi and between 4 and 6 for the Mini Multi which must contain the first four finishers in the race in any order. The main "Gagnant en 4" dividend is paid to winning bettors who selected four horses, with decreasing "Gagnant en 5", "Gagnant en 6" and "Gagnant en 7" dividends paid to winning bettors who selected five, six and seven horses respectively. The "Multi" bet operates on races with 14 or more starters. The "Mini Multi" operates on races with 10 to 13 starters and only allows for a maximum of six selections with no "Gagnant en 7" dividend.
 Super4: The better must correctly pick the first, second, third, and fourth finishers in the correct order. Only available on races with 5-9 runners.

Tiercé, Quarté+ and Quinté+ bets are typically only offered on the largest race of the day.

See also
 Advance-deposit wagering
 Arbitrage betting
 Betting exchange
 Betting pool
 Bookmaker
 Calcutta auction
 Prediction market
 Spread betting
 Sports betting systems
 Tote Ireland

References

Sports betting
Horse racing terminology
Greyhound racing
1867 introductions
Wagering
Gambling terminology